Hexiwu (Chinese: t , s , Héxīwù), formerly known as Ho-Hsi-Wu, was a port city in China along the Grand Canal. As Hexiwuzhen, a locality of about 25,000 people, has now been absorbed by the municipality of Tianjin's Wuqing District.

It has been the site of a mosque for China's Hui for centuries.

History
During the Ming dynasty, the bursting of several dikes at Hexiwu touched off a crisis in 1424. Mu Jin and Zhang Xin directed efforts by more than 5,000 workers from the Ministry of Public Works to repair the damage and restore the irrigation system.

The site played a minor role during the Boxer Rebellion, seeing battle on 25 July between the international relief force and the Kansu Braves under Dong Fuxiang.

References

Port cities and towns in China
Towns in Tianjin